Laufenburg station could refer to:

 Laufenburg (Baden) station in Laufenburg, Baden-Württemberg, Germany
 Laufenburg railway station (Switzerland) in Laufenburg, Aargau, Switzerland